is a 1968 Japanese comedy-chambara film directed by Kihachi Okamoto. The film had a screenplay written by Akira Murao and Okamoto, and is based on the story Torideyama no jushichinichi in Yamamoto Shugoro zenshu (1964) by Shūgorō Yamamoto.

Plot 
Tatsuya Nakadai stars as Genta, a former samurai who became disillusioned with the samurai lifestyle and left it behind to become a wandering yakuza gang member. He meets Hanjirō Tabata (Etsushi Takahashi) a farmer who wants to become a samurai to escape his powerless existence. Genta and Tabata wind up on opposite sides of clan intrigue when seven members of a local clan assassinate their chancellor. Although the seven, led by Tetsutarō Oikawa (Naoko Kubo) rebelled with the support of their superior, Ayuzawa (Shigeru Kōyama), he turns on them and sends members of the clan to kill them as outlaws.

Style
The film is a comically exaggerated exploration of what it is to be a samurai.  The characters either give up samurai status or fight to attain it, and samurai are seen behaving both honorably and very badly. The film has a parodic tone, with numerous references to earlier samurai films.

Cast 
Tatsuya Nakadai as Genta (Hyōdō Yagenta)
Etsushi Takahashi as Hanji (Hanjirō Tabata)
Yuriko Hoshi as Chino Kajii
Naoko Kubo as Tetsutarō Oikawa
Shigeru Kōyama as Ayuzawa
Akira Kubo as Monnosuke Takei
Seishirō Kuno as Daijirō Masataka
Tadao Nakamaru as Shōda Magobei
Eijirō Tōno as Moriuchi Hyōgo
Shin Kishida as Jurota Arao
Atsuo Nakamura as Tetsutaro
Ryosuke Kagawa as Mizoguchi
Takeo Chii as Yoshida Yaheiji
Susumu Kurobe as Ayusawa Kinzaburo
Isao Hashimoto as Konosuke Fujii
Yoshio Tsuchiya as Matsuo Shiroku
Hideyo Amamoto as Shimada Gendaiu

Release
Kill! was released theatrically in Japan on 22 June 1968 where it was distributed by Toho. It was released in the United States by Frank lee International with English subtitles in August 1968.

Reception
Along with Human Bullet and Judge and Jeopardy, Kill! gave art director Iwao Akune the award for Best Art Direction at the Mainichi Film Concours.

References

Sources

External links

Kill!: Pardon My Dust an essay by Howard Hampton at the Criterion Collection
Kill!: Rebel Samurai Cinema an essay by Chris D. at the Criterion Collection

1968 films
Films based on Japanese novels
Films directed by Kihachi Okamoto
1960s Japanese-language films
Samurai films
Films produced by Tomoyuki Tanaka
Films scored by Masaru Sato
Toho films
1960s Japanese films